Mykolaiv Oblast is subdivided into districts (raions) which are subdivided into territorial communities (hromadas).

Current

On 18 July 2020, the number of districts was reduced to four. These are:
 Bashtanka (Баштанський район), the center is in the city of Bashtanka; 
 Mykolaiv (Миколаївський район), the center is in the city of Mykolaiv;
 Pervomaisk (Первомайський район), the center is in the city of Pervomaisk;
 Voznesensk (Вознесенський район), the center is in the city of Voznesensk.

Administrative divisions until 2020

Before July 2020, Mykolaiv Oblast was subdivided into 24 regions: 19 districts (raions) and 5 city municipalities (mis'krada or misto), officially known as territories governed by city councils.

Cities under the oblast's jurisdiction:
Mykolaiv (Миколаїв), the administrative center of the oblast
Ochakiv (Очаків)
Pervomaisk (Первомайськ)
Voznesensk (Вознесенськ)
Yuzhnoukrainsk (Южноукраїнськ)
Districts (raions):
Arbuzynka (Арбузинський район)
Urban-type settlements under the district's jurisdiction:
Arbuzynka (Арбузинка)
Kostiantynivka (Костянтинівка)
Bashtanka (Баштанський район)
Cities and towns under the district's jurisdiction:
Bashtanka (Баштанка)
Berezanka (Березанський район)
Urban-type settlements under the district's jurisdiction:
Berezanka (Березанка)
Bereznehuvate (Березнегуватський район)
Urban-type settlements under the district's jurisdiction:
Bereznehuvate (Березнегувате)
Bratske (Братський район)
Urban-type settlements under the district's jurisdiction:
Bratske (Братське)
Domanivka (Доманівський район)
Urban-type settlements under the district's jurisdiction:
Domanivka (Доманівка)
Kazanka (Казанківський район)
Urban-type settlements under the district's jurisdiction:
Kazanka (Казанка)
Kryve Ozero (Кривоозерський район)
Urban-type settlements under the district's jurisdiction:
Kryve Ozero (Криве Озеро)
Mykolaiv (Миколаївський район)
Urban-type settlements under the district's jurisdiction:
Olshanske (Ольшанське)
Nova Odesa (Новоодеський район)
Cities and towns under the district's jurisdiction:
Nova Odesa (Нова Одеса)
Novyi Buh (Новобузький район)
Cities and towns under the district's jurisdiction:
Novyi Buh (Новий Буг)
Ochakiv (Очаківський район)
Pervomaisk (Первомайський район)
Urban-type settlements under the district's jurisdiction:
Pidhorodna (Підгородна)
Snihurivka (Снігурівський район)
Cities and towns under the district's jurisdiction:
Snihurivka (Снігурівка)
Veselynove (Веселинівський район)
Urban-type settlements under the district's jurisdiction:
Tokarivka (Токарівка), formerly Kudriavtsivka
Veselynove (Веселинове)
Vitovka (Вітовський район), formerly Zhovtneve Raion
Urban-type settlements under the district's jurisdiction:
Pervomaiske (Первомайське)
Voskresenske (Воскресенське)
Voznesensk (Вознесенський район)
Urban-type settlements under the district's jurisdiction:
Oleksandrivka (Олександрівка)
Vradiivka (Врадіївський район)
Urban-type settlements under the district's jurisdiction:
Vradiivka (Врадіївка)
Yelanets (Єланецький район)
Urban-type settlements under the district's jurisdiction:
Yelanets (Єланець)

References

Mykolaiv
Mykolaiv Oblast